Ya'ad (Destiny) was a short-lived, one-man political party in Israel. It is not related to the other political party of the same name, Ya'ad – Civil Rights Movement.

Background
The party was formed on 14 September 1978 during the ninth Knesset by Assaf Yaguri after the spectacular breakup of Dash. However, it disappeared after the 1981 elections when it failed to pass the electoral threshold.

External links
Ya'ad Knesset website

Political parties established in 1978
1978 establishments in Israel
Defunct political parties in Israel
Political parties with year of disestablishment missing
Liberal parties in Israel
Zionist political parties in Israel
1980s disestablishments in Israel
Political parties disestablished in the 1980s